"God in Me" is a song by American contemporary gospel duo Mary Mary featuring American gospel singer Kierra "Kiki" Sheard. It was released as the second single from their fourth studio album The Sound (2008), and was also featured on their greatest hits album Go Get It (2012). and was written by both Mary Mary and producer Warryn Campbell, husband of member Erica Campbell. The single is the group's first to chart on the Billboard Hot 100 since their debut single, "Shackles", charted in 2000. The song won Song of the Year at the 25th Annual Stellar Awards.

Music video
The music video for "God in Me" is about expressing individuality during a fashion show. It features appearances by Flex Alexander, Kanye West, Amber Rose, Common, Heavy D, and Fonzworth Bentley. America's Next Top Model, Cycle 11 runner-up Samantha Potter also made an appearance in the video. It ranked at #60 on BET's Notarized: Top 100 Videos of 2009 countdown.

Remixes
 Official Remix featuring Ne-Yo &  Kierra Sheard (3:19)
 Remix featuring Sean Ray
 Remix featuring Yung Joc
 Unofficial remix with ThaGIM (3.00)
 Dave Audé Club Mix (7:46)
 DJ Escape & Tony Coluccio Club Mix (8:26)
 Jamie J Sanchez Club Mix (7:49)
 Mathias Heilbron Club Mix (8:49)
 Richard Vission Club Mix (6:00)

Chart performance
The song has been a major success, and became the first song since their debut single "Shackles (Praise You)" to chart on the Billboard Hot 100, peaking at number 68. The song also spent 76 weeks on the Billboard Hot R&B/Hip-Hop Songs, and peaked at #5. It reached the Top 10 of the chart in its 42nd week, the longest climb to the top tier in the survey's 67-year history. It also was #1 on both the Hot Gospel Songs and Hot Dance Club Play charts.

Charts

Weekly charts

Year-end charts

References

External links
Music video for "God in Me" on YouTube

2008 singles
Mary Mary songs
Songs written by Warryn Campbell
2008 songs
Columbia Records singles